Stefanos Theodoridis (born 1950) is a Greek former professional footballer who played as a defender in the 1970s era.

Club career
Theodoridis started his career at the academies of AEK Athens and was promoted to the men's team in 1969 with the renewal of roster attempted by the then coach, Branko Stanković. He was a central defender unusual for the time, since he was good with the ball at his feet and had good positioning, resulting playing also as a right back. He won with AEK 3 Greek Championships. In the summer of 1978 he moved to Olympiacos, where he played for one season, before he closing his career at OFI in 1980.

International career
Theodoridis was capped once by the Greece national football team in 1971.

After football
Theodoridis became a Physical Education teacher and was involved with local government, having served for seven years as deputy mayor of cleanliness and water supply, for twelve years as president of the Sports Organization, and for two years as president of the Municipal Council of Nea Makri., while remaining in contact with the veterans association of AEK Athens.

Honours

AEK Athens
Alpha Ethniki: 1970–71, 1977–78
Greek Cup: 1977–78

References

1950 births
Living people
Greek footballers
Greece international footballers
AEK Athens F.C. players
Olympiacos F.C. players
Association football defenders
Constantinopolitan Greeks
Footballers from Istanbul